Hellebæk Textile Factory (Danish: Hellebæk Klædefabrik) is a former textile factory in Hellebæk, Helsingør, Denmark. The building at Nordre Strandvej 119 was removed in the 2000s and are now let out as serviced offices.

History

Kronborg Rifle Factory closed in 1870. Its premises were sold to J.W. Saxtorph of Rungstedgaard. He sold it to a consortium in 1873. One of the members of the consortium was destiller Jens Levin Tvede. The consortium founded Hellebæk Textile Factory on 12 April 1873 under the name Hellebæk Klæ­de- og Tæppefabrik. It was expanded with a cotton mill at Bondedammen in 1877. The factory closed in 1977.

Legacy
The buildings were renovated by Nordea in 2005 and are now used as serviced offices.

References

External links
 Official website
 Hellebæk Klædefabrik at Helsingør Leksikon
 Source

Textile mills in Denmark
Defunct textile companies of Denmark
Companies based in Helsingør Municipality
Danish companies established in 1873